Pavel Zabelin (born 30 June 1995) is a Belarusian professional football player currently playing for Shakhtyor Soligorsk.

Honours
Shakhtyor Soligorsk
Belarusian Premier League champion: 2022
Belarusian Super Cup winner: 2021, 2023

References

External links

Profile at teams.by

1995 births
Living people
Belarusian footballers
Association football midfielders
Belarusian expatriate footballers
Expatriate footballers in Uzbekistan
FC Neman Grodno players
FC Baranovichi players
FC Granit Mikashevichi players
FC Shakhtyor Soligorsk players
FK Andijon players